Atthapol Poonarae (Thai อัฐพล ภูนาแร่ ) is a Thai footballer. He plays for Thailand Premier League clubside Samut Songkhram FC.

Clubs

Samut Songkhram FC - 2007–present

References

1987 births
Living people
Atthapol Poonarae
Association football midfielders
Atthapol Poonarae